Korean Navy may refer to:

Currently
 Korean People's Navy, the navy of North Korea
 Republic of Korea Navy, the navy of South Korea

Historically
 Joseon Navy (1392–1907), under the Joseon Dynasty (1392–1910)